Random End is the second album from Finnish metal band Misery Inc., and it was released in spring 2006. The album was recorded at Grooveland (drums and bass), Monttu (guitars) and Wace Sound (vocals and keyboards) studios during fall 2005. Produced by Aksu Hanttu & Misery Inc. Mixed by Aksu Hanttu & Nino Laurenne at Sonic Pump Studios. Mastered by Svante Forsbäck at Chartmakers.

Track listing 

Hymn for Life
Fallen Rage
Further/Deeper
Yesterday's Grave
Apologies Denied
Cyanide
Source Of Fatal Addiction
Greed Rules the World
Truth
No Excuse For Weakness
…Out Of Here Alive
All songs written by Tolonen & Ylämäki except Further/Deeper was participated by Kauppinen. Lyrics by Tolonen, Näveri, Mankinen.

External links 
Misery Inc.'s official website

2006 albums
Misery Inc. albums